Far from Refuge is the third studio album by Irish post-rock band God Is an Astronaut, released in 2007 on Revive Records. The album was digitally remastered and re-released in 2011.

In December 2007, American webzine Somewhere Cold ranked Far from Refuge No. 9 on their 2007 Somewhere Cold Awards Hall of Fame.

Track listing

References

2007 albums
Revive Records albums
God Is an Astronaut albums